The name Dorothy has been used for three tropical cyclones in the Atlantic Ocean.
 Hurricane Dorothy (1966) - formed in July in the north Atlantic Ocean, remained away from land
 Tropical Storm Dorothy (1970) - Deadliest tropical storm of the season, caused 51 deaths, mostly in Martinique, while moving through the Lesser Antilles
 Hurricane Dorothy (1977) - formed near Bermuda and became extratropical near Newfoundland

Atlantic hurricane set index articles